The 2014 ICC Africa Twenty20 Division Three was an international 20-over cricket tournament held in Benoni, South Africa, from 22 to 25 March 2014. All matches were played at the Willowmoore Park complex.

The tournament, part of the qualification process for the 2016 World Twenty20, was contested by four affiliate members of the International Cricket Council (ICC), down from eight at the previous edition in 2012. The Gambia and Rwanda, ranked third and fourth at the previous tournament, were joined by Swaziland and Sierra Leone, the bottom-ranked teams at the 2012 Division Two event. The four teams played each other twice over a period of four days, for twelve matches overall. Swaziland and Sierra Leone finished equal on points, but Swaziland won the title through their net run rate. They consequently qualified for the 2014 Division Two tournament, played later in the year at the same venue.

In February 2016, it was announced that the ICC had determined that the Swaziland Cricket Association had fielded five ineligible players in the tournament, all of Asian descent. This resulted in the Swazi national team being disqualified from a future tournament.

Points table

Fixtures

Statistics

Most runs
The top five run-scorers are included in this table, ranked by runs scored and then by batting average.

Source: CricHQ

Most wickets

The top five wicket-takers are listed in this table, ranked by wickets taken and then by bowling average.

Source: CricHQ

References 

Africa Twenty20 Division Three 2014
International cricket competitions in 2013–14
ICC Africa Twenty20 Division Three
International cricket competitions in South Africa
ICC Africa Twenty20 Division Three